Jungle flycatcher may refer to:

 all species in the genus Vauriella
 seven species in the genus Cyornis

Birds by common name